The Manasseh Hills or hill country of Manasseh, directly derived from Hebrew: Menashe Heights, called Balad ar-Ruha in Arabic, meaning "Land of Winds", is a geographical region in northern Israel, located on the Carmel Range, between Mount Carmel and Mount Amir/Umm al-Fahm.
Regions of Israel

Etymology
The hill country of Manasseh or Manasseh hill country, sometimes fully capitalised, is named for its location within the allotment of the biblical Tribe of Manasseh, itself named after its biblical forefather, Manasses or Manasseh.

Geography

While Manasseh hill country (Ramat Menashe) is part of the mountain range, it is just 200 m above sea level on average, and peaks at 400 m. The plateau is bordered by the Jezreel Valley to the northeast, Wadi Milh (the Yokne'am Stream) to the northwest, Wadi Ara to the southeast, and the Nadiv Valley to the southwest.

The Manasseh Hill Country , known in Hebrew as Ramot Menashe, was officially added to UNESCO's World Network of Biosphere Reserves in 2011. The region was credited with encompassing "a mosaic of ecological systems that represent the Mediterranean Basin's version of the global evergreen sclerophyllous forests, woodlands and scrub ecosystem types."

Important Bird Area
A 2,500 ha tract of agricultural country with oak trees, on the western slopes of Mount Carmel, some 5 km from the coast, has been recognised as an Important Bird Area (IBA) by BirdLife International because it supports a population of lesser kestrels, with some 40 breeding pairs estimated in 1991.

Localities
Localities in Ramot Menashe include
Dalia, a kibbutz
Ein HaEmek, a community settlement
Ein HaShofet, a kibbutz
Gal'ed, a kibbutz
Ramat HaShofet, a kibbutz
Ramot Menashe, a kibbutz

See also
Geography of Israel

References

Biosphere reserves of Israel
Regions of Israel
Geography of Israel
Important Bird Areas of Israel